Femina may refer to:

Magazines
Femina (Denmark), a weekly women's magazine in Denmark published since 1952
Femina (Esperanto), a women's magazine in Esperanto, "not only for women", published since 2005
Femina (India), a bimonthly women's magazine in India published since 1959
Femina (Indonesia), a weekly women's magazine in Indonesia, published since 1972 
Femina (South Africa), a monthly women's magazine published in South Africa
Femina (Sweden), a monthly women's magazine in Sweden published since 1944
Femina (Switzerland), a Francophone Swiss supplement to Le Matin
Femina (France), a French women's magazine published from 1901 to 1954

Other
Ethinylestradiol/cyproterone acetate, a birth control pill
Femina (album), a 2009 album by John Zorn
Fémina, Argentine folk and hip hop trio
Femina, a 2009 album by The Legendary Tigerman
Femina (UK), a publishing house established by Muriel Box
Prix Femina, a French literary prize, named after the French magazine of the same name
Boldklubben Femina, a Danish women's association football club in Copenhagen